The equipment of the Malaysian Army can be subdivided into: ground vehicle, unmanned aerial vehicle, aircraft, watercraft, radar, air defense, infantry weapon and attire.

Ground vehicle

Unmanned aerial vehicle

Aircraft

Watercraft

Radar

Air defense

Infantry weapon

Attire

Historical equipment

Ground vehicle
FV101 Scorpion
Alvis Stormer
 SIBMAS
Cadillac Gage Commando
Panhard AML
Panhard M3
Ferret
 Daimler

Artillery
FH-70 Field Howitzer

Infantry weapon
HK P9S
Denel Vektor SP1
L1A1 Self-Loading Rifle
Bren L4A4 Light Machine Gun

Procurement
Since the recovery from the 1997 economic crisis, Malaysian Army, along with other branches of the Malaysian Armed Forces, has regained momentum in its modernising programs.

See also
 List of equipment of the Royal Malaysian Navy
 List of equipment of the Royal Malaysian Air Force
 List of aircraft of the Malaysian Armed Forces
 List of equipment of the Malaysian Maritime Enforcement Agency
 List of vehicles of the Royal Malaysian Police
 List of police firearms in Malaysia

References

 

Army Equipment
Equipment
Malaysian
Military equipment of Malaysia